Jahrbuch (German for yearbook) may refer to:

 Berliner Astronomisches Jahrbuch
 Gutenberg-Jahrbuch
 Jahrbuch für Philosophie und phänomenologische Forschung
 Jahrbuch Medien und Geschichte
 Jahrbuch über die Fortschritte der Mathematik
 Jahrbuch für Forschungen zur Geschichte der Arbeiterbewegung